The year 2010 in Archosaur paleontology was eventful.  Archosaurs include the only living dinosaur group — birds — and the reptile crocodilians, plus all extinct dinosaurs,  extinct crocodilian relatives, and pterosaurs. Archosaur palaeontology is the scientific study of those animals, especially as they existed before the Holocene Epoch began about 11,700 years ago.  The year 2010 in paleontology included various significant developments regarding archosaurs.

This article records new taxa of fossil archosaurs of every kind that have been described during the year 2010, as well as other significant discoveries and events related to paleontology of archosaurs that occurred in the year 2010.

Newly named crurotarsans

Newly named basal dinosauriforms

Newly named non-avian dinosaurs

 A new family of allosauroid theropods, Neovenatoridae, is published by Benson, Carrano, and Brusatte.
 A new family of tyrannosauroid theropods, Proceratosauridae is published by Rauhut, Milner and Moore-Fay.

62 new genera and additional 2 new species have been described in 2010.

Newly named birds

Newly named pterosaurs

Notes

References 

2010 in paleontology